Amalie may refer to:

People
 Amalie (given name), a female given name, derived from Amalia

Places
 Charlotte Amalie, U.S. Virgin Islands, capital of the territory
 Amalie Arena, a hockey stadium in Tampa, Florida

Businesses
 Amalie Oil Company, American motor oil producer

See also
 Amélie (disambiguation)
 Amalia (disambiguation)
 AmaLee (born 1992), U.S. singer and voice actress